The Bataan Provincial Board is the Sangguniang Panlalawigan (provincial legislature) of the Philippine province of Bataan.

The members are elected via plurality-at-large voting: the province is divided into two districts, each sending five members to the provincial board; the electorate votes for five members, with the five candidates with the highest number of votes being elected. The vice governor is the ex officio presiding officer, and only votes to break ties. The vice governor is elected via the plurality voting system province-wide.

The districts used in electing board members are coextensive with the legislative districts of Bataan.

District apportionment

List of members
An additional three ex officio members are the presidents of the provincial chapters of the Association of Barangay Captains, the Councilors' League, the Sangguniang Kabataan
provincial president; the municipal and city (if applicable) presidents of the Association of Barangay Captains, Councilor's League and Sangguniang Kabataan, shall elect amongst themselves their provincial presidents which shall be their representatives at the board.

Vice Governor

1st District

2nd District

3rd District

Ex officio seats

Reserved seats

Provincial boards in the Philippines
Politics of Bataan